The David di Donatello for Best Foreign Actor is a category in the David di Donatello Awards, described as "Italy’s answer to the Oscars". It was awarded by the Accademia del Cinema Italiano (ACI, Academy of Italian Cinema) to recognize outstanding efforts on the part of non-Italian film actors during the year preceding the ceremony. The award was created during the second edition of the ceremony, in 1957, and cancelled after the 1996 event.

Winners

1950s
1957
 Laurence Olivier - Richard III

1958
 Marlon Brando - Sayonara (ex aequo)
 Charles Laughton - Witness for the Prosecution

1959
 Jean Gabin - The Possessors

1960s
1960
 Cary Grant - North by Northwest

1961
 Charlton Heston - Ben-Hur

1962
 Anthony Perkins - Goodbye Again (ex aequo)
 Spencer Tracy - Judgment at Nuremberg

1963
 Gregory Peck - To Kill a Mockingbird

1964
 Peter O'Toole - Lawrence of Arabia (ex aequo)
 Fredric March - Seven Days in May

1965
 Rex Harrison - My Fair Lady

1966
 Richard Burton - The Spy Who Came In from the Cold

1967
 Richard Burton - The Taming of the Shrew (ex aequo)
 Peter O'Toole - The Night of the Generals

1968
 Warren Beatty - Bonnie and Clyde (ex aequo)
 Spencer Tracy - Guess Who's Coming to Dinner

1969
 Rod Steiger - The Sergeant

1970s
1970
 Peter O'Toole - Goodbye Mr. Chips (ex aequo)
 Dustin Hoffman - Midnight Cowboy

1971
 Ryan O'Neal - Love Story

1972
 Topol - Fiddler on the Roof

1973
 Yves Montand - César and Rosalie (ex aequo)
 Laurence Olivier - Sleuth

1974
 Robert Redford - The Sting (ex aequo)
 Al Pacino - Serpico

1975
 Burt Lancaster - Conversation Piece (ex aequo)
 Jack Lemmon - The Front Page (ex aequo)
 Walter Matthau - The Front Page

1976
 Philippe Noiret - Le Vieux Fusil (ex aequo)
 Jack Nicholson - One Flew Over the Cuckoo's Nest

1977
 Sylvester Stallone - Rocky (ex aequo)
 Dustin Hoffman - Marathon Man

1978
 Richard Dreyfuss - The Goodbye Girl

1979
 Richard Gere - Days of Heaven (ex aequo)
 Michel Serrault - La cage aux folles

1980s
1980
 Dustin Hoffman - Kramer vs. Kramer (ex aequo)
 Jack Lemmon - The China Syndrome

1981
 Burt Lancaster - Atlantic City

1982
 Klaus Maria Brandauer - Mephisto

1983
 Paul Newman - The Verdict

1984
 Woody Allen - Zelig

1985
 Tom Hulce - Amadeus

1986
 William Hurt - Kiss of the Spider Woman

1987
 Dexter Gordon - Round Midnight

1988
 Michael Douglas - Wall Street

1989
 Dustin Hoffman - Rain Man

1990s
1990
 Philippe Noiret - Life and Nothing But

1991
 Jeremy Irons - Reversal of Fortune

1992
 John Turturro - Barton Fink

1993
 Daniel Auteuil - A Heart in Winter

1994
 Anthony Hopkins - The Remains of the Day

1995
 John Travolta - Pulp Fiction

1996
 Harvey Keitel - Smoke

References

External links
 
 David di Donatello official website
 

David di Donatello
Film awards for lead actor